"No Worries" is the second single released from Blue band member Simon Webbe's debut solo album, Sanctuary (2005). The song features backing vocals from Liam Kennedy and Yvonne John Lewis. "No Worries" peaked at number four on the UK Singles Chart, the same position as its predecessor, "Lay Your Hands", but spent longer in the top 40. The song became a top-20 hit in Italy and reached number two in the Netherlands.

Track listings
UK CD1
 "No Worries"
 "Lay Your Hands" (Stargate Remix)

UK CD2
 "No Worries"
 "Give A Man Hope"
 "I Ain't You"

UK DVD single
 "No Worries" (video—the director's cut)
 Photo gallery featuring "Give A Man Hope"
 Behind the scenes at photophoot / "No Worries" (instrumental)

Charts

Weekly charts

Year-end charts

References

2005 singles
2005 songs
Simon Webbe songs
Songs written by Matt Prime
Songs written by Simon Webbe
Songs written by Tim Woodcock